The third season of Crazy Ex-Girlfriend premiered on The CW on October 13, 2017 and ran for 13 episodes until February 16, 2018. The season stars Rachel Bloom as Rebecca Bunch, a distraught young woman who is dealing with the fallout of being left at the altar. Vincent Rodriguez III, Donna Lynne Champlin, Pete Gardner, Vella Lovell, Gabrielle Ruiz, David Hull, and Scott Michael Foster co-star.

Cast

Main
 Rachel Bloom as Rebecca Bunch
 Vincent Rodriguez III as Josh Chan
 Donna Lynne Champlin as Paula Proctor
 Pete Gardner as Darryl Whitefeather
 Vella Lovell as Heather Davis
 Gabrielle Ruiz as Valencia Perez
 David Hull as Josh "White Josh" Wilson
 Scott Michael Foster as Nathaniel Plimpton III

Recurring
 Gina Gallego as Mrs. Hernandez  
 Erick Lopez as Hector 
 Esther Povitsky as Maya 
 Michael McMillian as Tim 
 Steve Monroe as Scott Proctor 
 Burl Moseley as Jim 
 Danny Jolles as George 
 Jacob Guenther as Chris 
 Johnny Ray Meeks as Kevin 
 Amy Hill as Lourdes Chan 
 Steele Stebbins as Tommy Proctor 
 Zayne Emory as Brendan Proctor 
 Jay Hayden as Dr. Daniel Shin 
 Michael Hyatt as Dr. Noelle Akopian 
 Michael Hitchcock as Bert 
 Lyndon Smith as Mona 
 Paul Welsh as Trent Maddock  

Guest
 Piter Marek as Dr. Davit Akopian 
 Ava Acres as Young Rebecca 
 Rory O'Malley as Jarl 
 Alberto Issac as Joseph Chan 
 Eugene Cordero as Alex 
 Robin Thomas as Marco Serrano 
 Josh Groban as himself 
 Bayne Gibby as Cornelia Wigfield 
 Tovah Feldshuh as Naomi Bunch 
 Rachel Grate as Audra Levine 
 David Grant Wright as Nathaniel Plimpton II 
 Susan Blakely as Gigi Plimpton 
 Eddie Pepitone as Bob O'Brien 
 Olivia Edward as Madison Whitefeather 
 Benjamin Siemon as Brody 
 Hunter Stiebel as Marty 
 Sofia Marie Gonzales as Ally 
 Dr. Phil as himself 
 B. J. Novak as himself 
 Parvesh Cheena as Sunil Odhav

Episodes

Every song listed is performed by Rebecca, except where indicated. Also, the Josh name is dropped from the episode titles after "Josh Is Irrelevant."

Production
The series was renewed for a third season on January 8, 2017. On April 5, 2017, it was announced that David Hull and Scott Michael Foster, who portray White Josh and Nathaniel respectively, were promoted to series regulars for season three.

Music
Each week, after an episode of Crazy Ex-Girlfriend aired, the soundtrack of that episode was released the next day. 

The full season soundtrack was released on July 20, 2018. It includes all the songs of season three, sans "The End of the Movie" due to legal issues with Josh Groban's record deals. However, it adds a full demo of the same song from Adam Schlesinger, three additional demos including an "earnest version" of "The Moment is Me" sung by writing team member Ilana Peña and an unused title sequence, and the cut song "Settle For Her" featuring Scott Michael Foster.

Reception

Critical response
The third season of Crazy Ex-Girlfriend has received critical acclaim from critics. On Rotten Tomatoes, it has been certified "fresh" with a score of 96% and an average rating of 9.0/10, based on 23 reviews. The site's critic consensus states: "Crazy Ex-Girlfriend's brave third season doubles down on the crazy, with a compassionate, compelling exploration of mental illness that is as honest as it is hilarious."

Ratings

Notes

References 

Season
2017 American television seasons
2018 American television seasons